Donald Jason Cothern (born November 12, 1970) is a brigadier general in the United States Space Force currently serving as the deputy commander of the Space Systems Command. He transferred to the Space Force from the United States Air Force in May 2021.

Prior to his current assignment, he was the assistant program director for development at the F-35 Lighting II Joint Program Office, where he was responsible for F-35 fighter fifth generation modernization activities.

Cothern was commissioned in 1993 as an ROTC graduate of the University of Central Florida. He served as the director of the Department of Defense’s Space Test Program and the Air Force's Hosted Payloads Office. As STP director, he also led the Rocket Systems Launch Program, where he was mission director for the DoD's first SpaceX Falcon 9 launch that flew NASA and National Oceanic and Atmospheric Administration's Deep Space Climate Observatory (DSCOVR) satellite in February 2015.

Education 
 1993 Bachelor of Science, aerospace engineering, University of Central Florida, Orlando
 1998 Squadron Officer School, Maxwell Air Force Base, Ala.
 2000 Master of Business Administration, California State University, Long Beach
 2002 Master of Science, Organizational Leadership, The George Washington University, Washington, D.C.
 2006 Master of Military Operational Arts and Science, Air Command and Staff College, Air University, Maxwell AFB, Ala.
 2009 Air War College, Maxwell AFB, Ala., by correspondence
 2009 The Program Manager's Course, Defense Acquisition University, Fort Belvoir, Va.
 2012 Master of National Resource Strategy, The Industrial College of the Armed Forces, National Defense University, Fort Lesley J. McNair, Washington, D.C.

Assignments 

1. September 1993–August 1995, Program Manager, 50th Logistics Support Squadron, Schreiver Air Force Base, Colo.
2. August 1995–July 1996, Executive Officer, 50th Logistics Group, Schreiver AFB, Colo.
3. July 1996–March 1998, Program Manager, Milstar Operations Support Division, Military Satellite Communications Joint Program Office, Space and Missile Systems Center, Los Angeles AFB, Calif.
4. March 1998–July 2000, Chief, Military Satellite Communications Programs Planning Branch, Military Satellite Communications Joint Program Office, Space and Missile Systems Center, Los Angeles AFB, Calif.
5. July 2000–June 2002, Student, United States Air Force Intern Program, Headquarters U.S. Air Force, the Pentagon, Arlington, Va.
6. June 2002–July 2005, Chief, Satellite Command and Control Branch, then Program Manager, Missile Warning Systems, Space Systems Program Office, Signals Intelligence Directorate, National Reconnaissance Office, Chantilly, Va.
7. July 2005–June 2006, Student, Air Command and Staff College, Maxwell AFB, Ala.
8. June 2006–June 2008, Deputy Chief, Future Systems Division, Developmental Planning Directorate, Space and Missiles System Center, Los Angeles AFB, Calif.
9. June 2008–July 2009, Chief, Space Systems Acquisition Division, Transformational Satellite Communications System Space Group, MILSATCOM Systems Wing, Space and Missiles System Center, Los Angeles AFB, Calif.
10. July 2009–August 2011, Commander, Space Based Infrared Systems Ground Squadron, then Materiel Leader, SBIRS Ground Systems Branch, SBIRS Ground Division, Infrared Space Systems Directorate, Space and Missile Systems Center, Los Angeles AFB, Calif.
11. August 2011–June 2012, Student, Industrial College of the Armed Forces, National Defense University, Fort Lesley J. McNair, Washington, D.C.
12. June 2012–July 2014, Chief, Requirements Integration Department, Defense Threat Reduction Agency and U.S. Strategic Command, Center for Combating Weapons of Mass Destruction, Fort Belvoir, Va.
13. July 2014–June 2017, Senior Material Leader – Lower, Director, DoD Space Test Program and Chief, Space Demonstrations Division, Advanced Systems and Development Directorate, Space and Missile Systems Center, Kirtland AFB, N.M.
14. June 2017–June 2020, Senior Material Leader – Upper, Assistant Program Director for Development and Production, then Assistant Program Director for Development, F-35 Joint Program Office, Arlington, Va.
15. June 2020– August 2021, Vice Commander, Space and Missile Systems Center, U.S. Space Force, Los Angeles AFB, Calif. 
16. August 2021 – present, Deputy Commander, Space Systems Command, Los Angeles AFB, Calif.

Awards and decorations

Cothern is the recipient of the following awards:

Dates of promotion

References 

Living people
Place of birth missing (living people)
Space and Missile Systems Center personnel
United States Air Force generals
Brigadier generals
University of Central Florida alumni
California State University
George Washington University alumni
National Defense University alumni
Recipients of the Legion of Merit
1970 births